Gloria Rasgado Corsi (born 2 August 1955) is a Mexican politician formerly from the Party of the Democratic Revolution. She served as Deputy of the LX Legislature of the Mexican Congress representing Veracruz, and previously served in the LVII Legislature of the Congress of Veracruz.

References

1955 births
Living people
People from Coatzacoalcos
Women members of the Chamber of Deputies (Mexico)
Party of the Democratic Revolution politicians
Politicians from Veracruz
20th-century Mexican politicians
20th-century Mexican women politicians
21st-century Mexican politicians
21st-century Mexican women politicians
Members of the Congress of Veracruz
Deputies of the LX Legislature of Mexico
Members of the Chamber of Deputies (Mexico) for Veracruz